Steven Yamukeka Jr. Lumbala (born September 9, 1991) is a retired Canadian football running back who played for the Montreal Alouettes of the Canadian Football League. After the 2012 CIS season, he was ranked as the 13th best player in the Canadian Football League’s Amateur Scouting Bureau December rankings for players eligible in the 2013 CFL Draft and sixth by players in Canadian Interuniversity Sport. Lumbala was drafted in the first round, fifth overall by the Alouettes and signed with the team on May 27, 2013. He played CIS football for the Calgary Dinos. He retired in April 2015 to take an average-paying job in the oil and gas industry. In 2020, Lumbala obtained his Juris Doctor from Université de Moncton Faculty of Law.

References

External links
Montreal Alouettes bio

1991 births
Calgary Dinos football players
Canadian football running backs
Living people
Montreal Alouettes players
Players of Canadian football from Quebec
Canadian football people from Montreal